The Commonwealth Junior and Cadet Fencing Championships, for fencers under 20 years of age (Junior) or under 17 years of age (cadet), are held every three years. are managed by the Commonwealth Fencing Federation

2006
The Championships were first held in Chennai, India from 24 January to 29 January 2006.

Fencers competed from England, Scotland, Wales, Northern Ireland, Australia, Singapore, India, New Zealand and Malaysia.

Winners for individual and team events were (in order of competition):-

24 January

Women's Sabre Individual - Christie Waddington (SCO)

25 January

Men's Foil Individual - Jozef Slowiaczek (AUS)

Women's Épée Individual - Corinna Lawrence (ENG)

26 January

Women's Foil Individual - Yu Ling Tai (SIG)

Men's Sabre Individual - Alex O'Connell (ENG)

27 January

Women's Foil Team - Australia

Men's Épée Individual - James Thornton (ENG)

28 January

Men's Épée Team - Australia

Women's Épée Team - England

Women's Sabre Team - Scotland

29 January

Men's Sabre Team - England

Men's Foil Team - Australia

2009
The 2nd Junior Commonwealth Fencing Championships were held in Penang, Malaysia between 15 February and 21 February 2009: and was  hosted by the Penang Amateur Fencing Association (PAFA).

Timetable
The timetable : for the 2009 games is as follows 
Venue: Penang International Sports Arena (PISA)

Sun Feb. 15

Weapon Check and DT Meeting

Mon Feb. 16

Weapon Check, Team Manager Meeting and Referee Meeting

 Winners for individual and team events were (in order of competition)

Tue Feb. 17

Opening Ceremony, 
Men's Épée - Joshua Koh (MAS)
Women's Sabre - Kira Roberts (ENG)

Wed Feb. 18

Men's Foil - Benjamin Peggs (ENG)
Women's Épée - Corrina Lawarence (ENG)

Thu Feb. 19

Men's Sabre - Alexander Crutchett (ENG)
Women's Foil - Elizabeth Ng (ENG)

Fri Feb. 20

Men's Foil (Team) - England
Women's Épée (Team) - England
Women's Sabre (Team) - England

Sat Feb. 21

Men's Épée (Team) - Malaysia
Men's Sabre (Team) - England
Women's Foil (Team) - Scotland

Closing Dinner - Evergreen Laural Hotel:

2012

The 2012 Commonwealth Junior Fencing Championships were held in Jersey.

Results - winners

Mon 13 Feb

MEN'S FOIL INDIVIDUAL- Amol Rattan (ENG)

WOMEN'S SABRE INDIVIDUAL - Aliya Itzkowitz (ENG)

Tue 14 Feb

MEN'S SABRE INDIVIDUAL - Soji Aiyenuro (ENG)

WOMEN'S EPEE INDIVIDUAL - Caitlin Chang (ENG)

Wed 15 Feb

MEN'S EPEE INDIVIDUAL - Matthew Anderson (CAN)

WOMEN'S FOIL INDIVIDUAL - Georgia Hannay (SCO)

Thurs 16 Feb

MEN'S FOIL TEAM - ENGLAND

WOMEN'S EPEE TEAM - ENGLAND

WOMEN'S SABRE TEAM - ENGLAND

Fri 17 Feb

MEN'S EPEE TEAM - ENGLAND

MEN'S SABRE TEAM - ENGLAND

WOMEN'S FOIL TEAM - SCOTLAND

2015
Winner 2015 Men's Junior Foil - Gold Individual & Gold Team - Alexander Lloyd GBR - Club ZFW - Coach Ziemowit Wojciechowski - Held in South Africa

The 2015 Championships are due to be held in Cape Town, South Africa in July 2015, and will be the first to incorporate Cadet (under-17) events, in addition to the Juniors.

2018
The 2018 Commonwealth Junior & Cadet Championships were held in Newcastle upon Tyne, England between 23 and 31 July 

Winners

Cadet Mens Épée: Sherjin Rajendran Shantimol (IND)

Cadet Men's Foil: Lucas Sings (CAN)

Cadet Men's Sabre: Julian Richards II (ENG)

Cadet Women's Épée: Eleanor Taylor (ENG)

Cadet Women's Foil: Tianji Lukins (AUS)

Cadet Women's Sabre: Ellen Robbins-Wilkinson (ENG)

Junior Mens Épée: William East

Junior Mens Foil: Harry Bird

References

External links

Fencing
C
International sports competitions hosted by India
Youth sport in India